Chinari is a village in the Berd Municipality of the Tavush Province of Armenia. Chinari lies very close to the Armenia–Azerbaijan border, and is the village closest to the abandoned Khoranashat monastery, which lies on a hill northeast of the town, only feet away from the border.

Gallery

References

External links 

Populated places in Tavush Province